Shahabad district or Arrah district, headquartered at Arrah (now part of Bhojpur District, Bihar) was a Bhojpuri speaking district in western Bihar, India, making the western border of Bihar with Uttar Pradesh. In 1972, the district was split into two districts: Bhojpur and Rohtas. Kaimur District was carved out from Rohtas in 1991 and Buxar District from Bhojpur in 1992. Historically, the geographic area was the eastern part of the Mahajanapada Kingdom of Kashi, with the Son River separating it from Magadh.

The districts in erstwhile Shahabad are as follows:

 Bhojpur District headquartered at Arrah
 Rohtas District headquartered at Sasaram
 Kaimur District headquartered at Bhabua
 Buxar District headquartered at Buxar

All four above districts fall under the Patna Division along with Patna and Nalanda District.

Notable persons 
 Kamla Persad-Bissessar, Seventh Prime Minister of Trinidad and Tobago and first woman Prime Minister of Trinidad and Tobago (great-grandfather is from Shahabad)
 Chacha Ramgoolam, First Prime Minister and Chief Minister of Mauritius (father from Shahabad)
 Navin Ramgoolam, Former Prime Minister of Mauritius (grandfather from Shahabad)
Anerood Jugnauth, Former Prime Minister of Mauritius (grandfather is from Shahabad)
Pravind Jugnauth, Present Prime Minister of Mauritius (great-grandfather is from Shahabad)
 Sher Shah Suri, Founder of Sur Dynasty who had built Grand Trunk Road
 Ustad Bismillah Khan, shehnai maestro and recipient of Bharat Ratna
 Babu Jagjivan Ram, fourth Deputy PM and longest-serving union minister of India
 Meira Kumar,  retd. Indian Foreign Service (IFS) officer & first woman Lok Sabha Speaker.
 Ram Subhag Singh, Railway Minister of India from 14 February 1969 to 4 November 1969
 Bhuvaneshwar Prasad Sinha, sixth Chief Justice of India
 Bisheshwar Prasad Singh, former Chief Justice of Bombay High Court
 Anil Sinha, Indian Police Service (IPS) officer and current Director of CBI
 Srimat Pandey, Indian Administrative Service (IAS) officer 1984 batch. Former Principal Secretary of Rajasthan.
 Bindeshwari Dubey, 21st Chief Minister of Bihar & former Union Minister of India
 Anant Sharma, former Union Minister, and Governor of Punjab and West Bengal state
 Prashant Kishor, a political strategist who led the NDA to victory in the 2014 Elections
 Vinay Pathak, Bollywood actor
 Mohd Zama Khan, Member of Legislative Assembly from Chainpur Vidhan sabha and Minister of Minority Affairs in Bihar Government
 Manoj Tiwari, Member of Parliament & one of the two Bhojpuri cinema superstar
 Vashishtha Narayan Singh, Indian mathematician and former NASA scientist
 Veer Kunwar Singh, the Indian freedom fighter who fought the British at the age of 80
 Sardar Harihar Singh, Former Chief Minister of Bihar (From Chaungain)
 Abdul Qaiyum Ansari; Freedom fighter, President of All India Momin conference through which he fought against Jinnah's two-nation theory, former cabinet minister of Bihar, member of parliament
Rajkumar Shahabadi, a film producer from Shahabad who produced Bhojpuri cinema's first film, Ganga Maiyya Tohe Piyari Chadhaibo. Rajkumar Shahabadi, his son, is also a film producer and his granddaughter, Sheena Shahabadi, is an actress.

References

Former districts of Bihar